The East Yosemite League is a high school athletic league that is part of the CIF Central Section.

Members
 Porterville High School
 Redwood High School (Visalia) 
 Monache High School
 El Diamante High School
 Golden West High School
 Mt. Whitney High School

References

CIF Central Section